Sarah Todd is an Australian celebrity chef, model, restaurateur, and cookbook author. She first earned recognition after appearing on MasterChef Australia in 2014.

Career 
Todd trained at Le Cordon Bleu, London. She competed on the sixth season of MasterChef Australia in 2014. After cooking aloo gobi on the show, she gained over 50,000 social media followers from India.

In 2015, Todd opened her first restaurant, Antares in Goa, India, which she co-owns and operates.  The building and opening of Antares was documented in the SBS Australia series My Restaurant in India, which aired in Australia in 2016. The series has subsequently been aired in 150 countries around the world.

During the time Todd spent in Goa, she also filmed Serve It Like Sarah, a 10-episode adventure, travel and food series airing on Fox Life India, Choice TV, New Zealand and Foxtel from 2016.

Todd's first cookbook My Healthy Model Cookbook was published by Penguin Australia in 2016.

In 2017, Todd joined fellow judges, Riyaaz Amlani and Vishal Dadlani, in the reality TV Show 'Grilled' on Fox Life India.

In 2018, Todd hosted the documentary Awesome Assam With Sarah Todd, which aired on Fox Life India, National Geographic Channel and Foxtel. The show was also featured in the Broadcast Audience Research Council India report and the content increased the viewership for the slot by almost 60%. It also had the second best ATS (Average Time Spent) among all the other content in the week on National Geographic.

In 2019, My Second Restaurant In India, which documents the building and opening Todd's second restaurant, The Wine Rack in Mumbai, aired on SBS Australia, W Channel in the UK, Choice TV New Zealand and Fox Life India.

On 8 January 2019, a local was burning land next door to her restaurant Antares in Goa, when embers flew onto the property causing a major fire. Three months later, the restaurant was rebuilt and in operation.

In 2020, Todd was invited to compete on Masterchef Australia'''s twelfth season, which exclusively featured high-performing past contestants who had failed to win their respective seasons. However, she refused the offer due to being busy with her career commitments at the time.

In 2022, Todd was again invited to compete on MasterChef Australia'''s fourteenth season, this time featuring a mix of returning contestants and new contenders. She accepted the offer, going on to improve upon her original placing by 7 spots and finishing runner-up, with Billie McKay winning the title for the second time.

Personal life 
Todd was in a relationship with Devinder Garcha. They had a son together in 2011. She and Garcha became engaged in 2013 but subsequently broke up.

Filmography

References

External links 
 

Living people
Australian television chefs
Alumni of Le Cordon Bleu
Cookbook writers
Australian restaurateurs
1987 births